Occupation: Rainfall Chapter 1 is a 2020 Australian science fiction action film written and directed by Luke Sparke. It is a sequel to the 2018 film Occupation.

Plot
Two years after the alien invasion, the human resistance in Sydney learns about an alien operation called "Rainfall" related to a location, Pine Gap. No details are known but a team of three, including one Alien, sets out to learn more. The human resistance in Sydney is attacked and destroyed, along with Sydney itself. Survivors flee to a military mountain base but it too is attacked and destroyed. The recon team arrives at Pine Gap which turns out to be a US intelligence base hosting two goofy survivors despite being destroyed on the surface. "Rainfall" is an artificial asteroid of sorts hidden below the base and created by the aliens, with potential high tech capabilities. A hasty plan to destroy the asteroid is made but to no avail, the asteroid falls in the hands of attacking aliens.

Cast
 Dan Ewing as Matt Simmons
 Jet Tranter as Amelia Chambers
 Temuera Morrison as Peter Bartlett
 Daniel Gillies as Wing Commander Hayes
 Lawrence Makoare as Gary the Alien
 Brad McMurray as Gary the Alien 
 Mark Coles Smith as Captain Wessex
 Ben Chisholm as Steve
 Jason Isaacs as Steve (voice)
 Ken Jeong as Bud Miller
 Erin Connor as Jenny Bartlett
 Trystan Go as Marcus Chambers
 Izzy Stevens as Isabella Bartlett
 David Roberts	as Abraham
 Vince Colosimo as Jacob
 Katrina Risteska as Suarez

Production
On 17 September 2020, it was announced that Jason Isaacs had joined the cast of Occupation: Rainfall. On the same day, it was announced that the film was in post-production, with visual effects being worked on by artists behind Star Wars: The Last Jedi.

Home media
The film is set to make its SVOD debut on Netflix in the United States on 9 October 2021.

Sequel
Luke Sparke is working in active development of Rainfall Chapter 2.

References

External links
 
 

2020 films
Alien invasions in films
2020s English-language films
2020 science fiction action films
Australian science fiction action films
Films shot on the Gold Coast, Queensland